Adralaid is a small islet belonging to Virtsu small borough in Lääneranna Parish, Pärnu County, Estonia.

See also
List of islands of Estonia

Islands of Estonia
Lääneranna Parish